William "Bill" Gerald Merry (born 8 August 1955) is a former English cricketer. Merry was a right-handed batsman who bowled right-arm medium pace. He was born at Newbury, Berkshire and educated at Chells Secondary Modern in Staffordshire.

References

External links
Bill Merry at ESPNcricinfo
Bill Merry at CricketArchive

1955 births
Living people
People from Newbury, Berkshire
English cricketers
Hertfordshire cricketers
Minor Counties cricketers
Middlesex cricketers
D. H. Robins' XI cricketers